The Greensburg Land Office, on Courthouse Square in Greensburg in St. Helena Parish, Louisiana, was built in the 1820s.  It was listed on the National Register of Historic Places in 1980.

It is a one-room common bond brick structure with a small portico having two large Doric brick columns.  Its interior is dominated by a large paneled Adams mantel.

It is one of the two or three oldest buildings in the "Florida Parishes" of Louisiana.

In 1980 the build was in use as a Veterans' Administration Office.  It is located nearly adjacent to the entrance to the St. Helena Parish Courthouse.

References

Buildings and structures on the National Register of Historic Places in Louisiana
Greek Revival architecture in Louisiana
Buildings and structures completed in 1825
St. Helena Parish, Louisiana